Vriesea saundersii is a plant species in the genus Vriesea. This species is endemic to Brazil.

Cultivars
Cultivars with some ancestry from V. saundersii include:
 Vriesea 'Administrateur Dehalu'
 Vriesea 'Colonel Marchand'
 Vriesea 'De Willdemaniana'
 Vriesea 'Esperanza'
 Vriesea 'Fair To Middlin'
 Vriesea 'Highway Beauty'
 Vriesea 'Honeycomb'
 Vriesea 'Ingrid'
 Vriesea 'Kitteliana'
 Vriesea 'Morreniano-Saundersii'
 Vriesea 'Pete's First'
 Vriesea 'Rexaundersii'
 Vriesea 'RoRo'
 Vriesea 'Saucy Ruby'
 Vriesea 'Sceptre d'Or'
 Vriesea 'Telstar'
 Vriesea 'Zelia Stoddart'

References

saundersii
Flora of Brazil
Taxa named by Élie-Abel Carrière